Aamer Azmat (born 26 November 1998) is a Pakistani cricketer. He made his List A debut on 18 January 2021, for Khyber Pakhtunkhwa, in the 2020–21 Pakistan Cup. He made his Twenty20 debut on 7 October 2021, for Khyber Pakhtunkhwa in the 2021–22 National T20 Cup.

References

External links
 

1998 births
Living people
Pakistani cricketers
Khyber Pakhtunkhwa cricketers
Cricketers from Peshawar